White City is a London Underground station on Wood Lane in White City, west London, England, on the Central line between Shepherds Bush and East Acton stations in Travelcard Zone 2. The station is in a deep brick-sided cutting – and is designed in a similar way to Harrow-on-the-Hill station.

History
The station was opened on 23 November 1947, replacing the earlier Wood Lane station. Its construction started after 1938 and had been scheduled for completion by 1940, but the Second World War delayed its opening for another seven years. The architectural design of the station won an award at the Festival of Britain and a commemorative plaque recording this is attached to the building to the left of the main entrance.

The station today

An interesting feature of the station is that the line adopts right-hand running through the station rather than the conventional left-hand running. This is a historical consequence of the reversal of the tracks in the tunnels of the anti-clockwise loop track built for the now-disused Wood Lane station, situated a short distance to the south of White City which was opened in 1908 as the then western terminus of the Central London Railway. The two tracks return to their normal left-hand orientation by a surface fly-over roughly halfway between White City and East Acton stations.

The station's running layout has three tracks, with the centre track having platforms on each side meaning that it can handle trains running in either direction. A siding between the running lines to the north of the station allows trains from Central London to be reversed and run back eastwards.  Trains going out of service can return to the below-ground White City depot to the south of the station via sidings between the running lines.

The nearby Wood Lane station on the Circle and Hammersmith & City lines provides an interchange between the lines.

This station is also directly opposite the BBC Television Centre and is within walking distance of Loftus Road, home of Queens Park Rangers F.C. and Westfield London.

The station received a certificate of merit in the 2009 National Railway Heritage Awards, London Regional category, for the modernisation (completed in 2008) that took care to retain heritage and architectural features.

Similarly named station
An earlier Wood Lane station on the Metropolitan line was located a short distance to the south and was also known as White City from 23 November 1947 until its closure in 1959.

Connections
London Buses routes 72, 95, 220, 228, 272 and night route N72 serve the station directly. White City bus station is a few minutes walk south of the station.

References

External links

 White City Station in 1951.
Shepherd's Bush and White City development 

Central line (London Underground) stations
London Underground Night Tube stations
Tube stations in the London Borough of Hammersmith and Fulham
Railway stations in Great Britain opened in 1947
1947 establishments in England
Tube station